Sport Vereniging Atlétiko Tera Corá, or ATC is a Bonaire association football club based in Kralendijk. The club competes in the BFF Kampionato, the top tier of football in Bonaire.

Squad

References

External links 
 SV Atlétiko Tera Corá on Facebook

Football clubs in Bonaire
Football clubs in the Netherlands Antilles
1977 establishments in Bonaire
Association football clubs established in 1977